Little Big Man is a 1970 American Western film directed by Arthur Penn and based on the 1964 novel Little Big Man by Thomas Berger. While broadly categorized as a western, or an epic, the film encompasses several literary/film genres, including comedy, drama and adventure. The film follows the life of a white man who was raised by members of the Cheyenne nation during the 19th century. The film is largely concerned with contrasting the lives of American pioneers and Native Americans throughout the progression of the boy's life.  It stars Dustin Hoffman, Chief Dan George, Faye Dunaway, Martin Balsam, Jeff Corey and Richard Mulligan.

Little Big Man is an early  revisionist Western in its sympathetic depiction of Native Americans and its exposure of the villainous practices of the  United States Cavalry.  The revision uses elements of satire and tragedy to examine prejudice and injustice. Little Big Man is an anti-establishment film of the period, indirectly protesting America's involvement in the Vietnam War by portraying the United States Armed Forces negatively.

In 2014, Little Big Man was deemed "culturally, historically, or aesthetically significant" by the Library of Congress and selected for preservation in the National Film Registry.

Plot
In 1970, 121-year-old Jack Crabb, the oldest man in the world, is residing in a hospice and recounts his life story to a curious historian. Among other things, Crabb claims to have been a captive of the Cheyenne, a gunslinger, an associate of Wild Bill Hickok, a scout for General George Armstrong Custer, and the sole white survivor of the Battle of the Little Bighorn.

Childhood
Jack begins his story in a flashback to 1859, when he was 10 years old. He and his older sister Caroline survived the massacre of their pioneer parents by the Pawnee and are discovered by Shadow, a Cheyenne brave, who takes the siblings to his village. Caroline escapes, but Jack remains and is reared by the good-hearted tribal leader, Old Lodge Skins.

As Jack gets older, he unwittingly makes an enemy of another boy, Younger Bear; however, Younger Bear eventually owes his life to Jack when he saves Younger Bear's life from a Pawnee brave. Jack is given the name "Little Big Man" because he is short but very brave.

In 1865, when Jack is 16, he is captured by U.S. Cavalry troopers during a skirmish and renounces his Cheyenne upbringing in order to save himself from being killed. After spending time in U.S. Army custody and going through interrogations and debriefing, Jack, being a minor, is put in the foster care of Reverend Silas Pendrake and his sexually frustrated wife, Louise, who tries to seduce Jack. When he witnesses Mrs. Pendrake having sex with the soda shop owner, Jack leaves the Pendrake household and renounces his foster parents and religion.

Gunslinger
In 1866, Jack becomes the apprentice of the snake-oil salesman Meriweather. The two are tarred and feathered when their customers realize that Meriweather's products are fraudulent. One of the angry customers is Jack's now-grown sister, Caroline, with whom he reunites. She attempts to mold her brother into a gunslinger named "the Soda Pop Kid". Jack meets Wild Bill Hickok at a saloon, and Hickok takes a liking to the young man. When Hickok is forced to kill a man in self-defense, Jack loses his taste for gunslinging and Caroline deserts him.

Some months later, Jack becomes a partner in a general store and marries a Swedish woman named Olga. Jack's business partner turns out to be a thieving scoundrel. The famous cavalry officer George Armstrong Custer pays a visit and suggests the couple restart their lives further west and assures them they have nothing to fear from Indians.

Jack and Olga set out, but their stagecoach is ambushed by Cheyenne warriors. Olga is abducted and Jack sets out in search of her. He is reunited with Old Lodge Skins and Younger Bear. Younger Bear has become a Contrary – a warrior who does everything in reverse. Jack makes friends with the Heemaneh Little Horse, but continues on his search for Olga.

First round with Custer
A few months later, Jack eventually becomes a "muleskinner" in Custer's 7th Cavalry, only because Custer incorrectly determines that was Jack's past job. He takes part in a battle against the Cheyenne, but when the troopers begin killing women and children, Jack turns on them.

On the outskirts of the massacre, Jack is attacked by Shadow, the Cheyenne warrior who saved him as a child but now does not recognize him. Shadow is killed by a cavalryman, and Jack discovers Shadow's daughter, Sunshine, giving birth while hiding from the onslaught. He returns with her to Old Lodge Skins's tribe. Sunshine becomes his wife and bears him a child. Jack again encounters Younger Bear, who is no longer a Contrary but is now the henpecked husband of the long-lost Olga. The traumatized Olga does not recognize Jack, who makes no attempt to make her remember him. Sunshine asks Jack to take in her three widowed sisters as wives, and to father children with them. He is reluctant at first, but finally agrees.

A little later in November 1868, Custer and the 7th Cavalry make a surprise attack on the Cheyenne camp at the Washita River. Jack saves the now-blind and elderly Old Lodge Skins, but Sunshine, their child, and her sisters are killed. Jack tries to infiltrate Custer's camp to exact revenge, but loses his nerve to kill Custer.

Mad hermit
Disheartened, Jack withdraws from life and becomes the town drunk living in Deadwood, South Dakota for the next several years. While in a drunken stupor, he is recognized by Wild Bill Hickok, who gives him money to get cleaned up. Hickok is shot and killed while playing cards and, with his last breath, asks Jack to bring some money to a widow he was having an affair with. Jack visits the widow, now a prostitute who turns out to be Louise Pendrake. Jack gives her the money that Hickok intended for her to use to start a new life, but again rebuffs her sexual advances.

Jack soon becomes a trapper and hermit. His mind becomes unhinged after coming across an empty trap with a severed animal limb. He prepares to commit suicide, but sees Custer and his troops marching nearby, and decides to return to his quest for revenge.

Second round with Custer
Custer hires Jack as a scout, reasoning that anything he says will be a lie, thus serving as a perfect reverse barometer. Jack tricks Custer into leading his troops into a trap at the Little Bighorn (1876) by truthfully telling Custer of the overwhelming force of Native Americans hidden within the valley.

As Custer's troops are slaughtered by the combined Sioux and Cheyenne group, Custer begins to rave insanely. Jack is wounded. The maddened Custer attempts to shoot Jack when he tells Custer to shut up, but is killed by Younger Bear, who then carries Jack away from the battlefield. Having thus discharged his life debt, Younger Bear tells Jack that the next time they meet, he can kill Jack without becoming an evil person.

Old Lodge Skins awaits death, as does Jack
Back at the Cheyenne camp, Jack accompanies Old Lodge Skins to a nearby hill, the Indian burial ground, where the old man, dressed in full chief's regalia, has declared "It is a good day to die", and decides to end his life with dignity. He offers his spirit to the Great Spirit, and lies down at his spot at the Indian Burial Ground to wait for death.

Instead, it begins to rain. Old Lodge Skins is revealed to still be alive, and says, "Well, sometimes the magic works. Sometimes it doesn't." They return to his lodge to have dinner.

Epilogue

Back in the present day, Jack abruptly ends his narrative story and he dismisses the historian. The final shot shows the aged Jack sitting in his wheelchair and somberly thinking back about his life in a world which no longer exists.

Cast
 Dustin Hoffman as Jack Crabb (a.k.a. Little Big Man)
 Faye Dunaway as Louise Pendrake (a.k.a. Lulu Kane)
 Chief Dan George as Old Lodge Skins
 Martin Balsam as Allardyce T. Meriweather
 Richard Mulligan as Gen. George Armstrong Custer
 Jesse Vint as Lieutenant 
 Jack Bannon as Captain
 Jeff Corey as Wild Bill Hickok
 Jack Mullaney as card player
 Aimée Eccles as Sunshine
 Kelly Jean Peters as Olga Crabb
 Carole Androsky as Caroline Crabb
 Robert Little Star as Little Horse
 Cal Bellini as Younger Bear
 Thayer David as Reverend Silas Pendrake
 Ruben Moreno as Shadow That Comes in Sight
 Steve Shemayne as Burns Red in the Sun
 William Hickey as the Historian
 James Anderson as Sergeant (in his final film role)
 M. Emmet Walsh as Shot Gun Guard

Historical basis
The historical Little Big Man was a Native American leader bearing no resemblance to the Jack Crabb character. Little Big Man is known for his involvement in the capture and possible assassination of Crazy Horse at Fort Robinson in 1877.

The movie's portrayal of the Battle of Washita River as a Custer-led massacre of women and children (which Penn compares to the Holocaust) is not entirely accurate as the camp was partially occupied by tribal warriors . The film, however, is consistent with historical records of other encounters between Indians and the U.S. Cavalry; the Cavalry's common tactic was to wait until the warriors had left the camp to hunt, or to lure the warriors away with assurances of good hunting, and then to attack the unprotected village. The two massacre scenes are historically reversed, the Sand Creek massacre occurring first in 1864, where Colorado militia (not including Custer) attacked a peaceful contingent of Native Americans, killing more than 150 women, children and elderly men. (The Sand Creek Massacre was depicted in another 1970 Western, Soldier Blue.) The Custer-led raid on the Washita occurred in 1868.

The film also presents an inaccurate representation of the death of Wild Bill Hickok.  Hickok was actually killed nearly two months after the Battle of the Little Bighorn on August 2, 1876, while playing poker at Nuttal & Mann's Saloon in Deadwood, South Dakota.  Uncharacteristically, Hickok had his back turned to the door.  At 4:15 p.m., Jack McCall walked in and shot Hickok in the back of the head.  Hickok was famously holding two pairs — aces of uncertain suits and black eights — when he was shot, a set of cards thereafter called the "Dead Man's Hand".

The film's depiction of Lieutenant Colonel George Armstrong Custer as a lunatic at the Battle of the Little Bighorn was intended as satire, though many of his quirks and vanities were inspired by contemporary observations. Custer's fatal tactics at the Little Bighorn were far more complex than portrayed in the film, which portrays him as having a searing hatred of Indians and acting ruthlessly towards them in battle.

The character of Jack Crabb is partially based on Curley, one of Custer's Native American scouts from the Crow tribe. Curley rode with Custer's 7th Cavalry into the valley of the Little Bighorn, but was relieved of duty before the final attack, retreating to a nearby bluff and witnessing much of the action. Many conflicting stories of the era embellished Curley's participation, stating in several cases that he disguised himself with a Cheyenne blanket to escape the immediate field of battle. He was interviewed many times, with some writers claiming him to be the only surviving witness from the U.S. side of Custer's Last Stand. Curley gave several variations of his participation in the battle, and the accuracy of his later recollections has been questioned.  Thomas Leforge, however, who had himself recruited most of the Crow scouts for the event, maintained in Leforge's narrated biography, that the claims were false and that Curley neither took part, as a scout had been expected to take part, nor himself claimed to have been in the battle.

Production
To obtain the hoarse voice of a 121-year-old man, Hoffman sat in his dressing room and screamed at the top of his lungs for an hour. The makeup for the ancient Crabb was created by Dick Smith from foam latex and included revolutionary false eyelids that could blink along with the actor's. Due to editing, and much to Smith's chagrin, no blinks were visible in the finished film. Of the makeup, Hoffman was quoted in Life as saying, "I defy you to put on that makeup and not feel old". The role of Chief Old Lodge Skins was initially offered to Marlon Brando, Paul Scofield, and Laurence Olivier, all of whom turned it down. The Little Bighorn battle scenes were filmed on location at Crow Agency, Montana near the actual battle site.  Some of the town scenes were filmed in Nevada City, Montana, a town that by 1970 consisted predominantly of historic 19th-century buildings brought from elsewhere in Montana.
All outdoor Indian scenes other than the Little Bighorn battle were filmed near Calgary, Alberta, Canada.  Some interior and various footage was shot on Hollywood sets. All Indian extras were North American Indians, though Aimée Eccles, who played Sunshine, is actually of British and Chinese descent, and Cal Bellini, who played Younger Bear, is actually a Malay originally from Singapore.

Old Lodge Skins dies at the end of the novel but not in the film. In an interview Arthur Penn explained the change: "We thought long and hard about this and in the first draft of the script he does die, but this death would have introduced an element of sadness into the film and we didn't want this. The film would have become dramatic, even melodramatic, instead of being picaresque. I also wanted to show that not only were the Indians going to be destroyed, but they were also condemned to live. On the whole, audiences like their entertainment dramatically compact and homogenous, but I want the opposite. A film should remain free and open, not with everything defined and resolved."

Reception
Little Big Man received widespread acclaim from film critics. It was among AFI's 400 movies nominated to be on their list of America's greatest 100 movies. Review aggregator Rotten Tomatoes reports that 24 of 25 professional critics gave the film a positive review, with a rating average of 7.9/10; in total, the film has a 96% rating on the website.

In his December 15, 1970, review, Vincent Canby of The New York Times called the movie, "Arthur Penn's most extravagant and ambitious movie, an attempt to capture the essence of the American heritage in the funny, bitter, uproarious adventures of Jack Crabb." Roger Ebert, of the Chicago Sun-Times, agreed, giving the film four stars out of four stars, and describing Little Big Man as "an endlessly entertaining attempt to spin an epic in the form of a yarn."

Awards and nominations
Chief Dan George was nominated for an Academy Award as Best Actor in a Supporting Role. He won many honors for his performance, including the National Society of Film Critics Award and the New York Film Critics Circle Award. He was also nominated for a Golden Globe as Best Supporting Actor.

Hoffman was nominated as Best Actor by the British Academy of Film and Television Arts. The screenplay by Calder Willingham was nominated for the Writers Guild of America Award as Best Drama Adapted from Another Medium.

The film won a Special Mention at the 7th Moscow International Film Festival in 1971.

In 2014, the film was deemed "culturally, historically, or aesthetically significant" by the Library of Congress and selected for preservation in the National Film Registry.

Legacy
Arthur Hiller's 1984 comedy drama Teachers features Richard Mulligan partially reprising his Custer role as Herbert Gower, an outpatient from a mental institution who is accidentally put in charge of a U.S. history class and teaches his pupils while impersonating historical figures such as Custer, but also Abe Lincoln and Ben Franklin, amongst others.

Home media
, Little Big Man has been released worldwide on VHS and DVD, and in the U.S. on a region free Blu-ray.

See also
 The Scarlet West (1925)
 General Custer at the Little Big Horn (1926)
 They Died With Their Boots On (1941)
 Frank Finkel

References

External links

 Little Big Man  essay by Kimberly Lindbergs on the National Film Registry website
 
 

1970 films
1970s Western (genre) comedy films
American Indian Wars films
American Western (genre) comedy films
Cinema Center Films films
Cultural depictions of George Armstrong Custer
Cultural depictions of Wild Bill Hickok
Films about Native Americans
Films based on American novels
Films based on works by Thomas Berger (novelist)
Films directed by Arthur Penn
Films set in 1859
Films set in 1865
Films set in 1866
Films set in 1868
Films set in 1876
Films set in 1970
Films set in Montana
Films set in Oklahoma
Films set in South Dakota
Films shot in Alberta
Films shot in Montana
Revisionist Western (genre) films
United States National Film Registry films
1970s English-language films
1970s American films